The 1992 Nigerian Senate election in Borno State was held on July 4, 1992, to elect members of the Nigerian Senate to represent Borno State. Abubakar Mahdi representing Borno South and Hassan Abba Sadiq representing Borno North won on the platform of Social Democratic Party, while Ali Modu Sheriff representing Borno Central won on the platform of the National Republican Convention.

Overview

Summary

Results

Borno South 
The election was won by Abubakar Mahdi of the Social Democratic Party.

Borno North 
The election was won by Hassan Abba Sadiq of the Social Democratic Party.

Borno Central 
The election was won by Ali Modu Sheriff of the National Republican Convention.

References 

Bor
Borno State Senate elections
July 1992 events in Nigeria